Mercy is a not-for-profit Catholic health care organization founded in 1871 by the Sisters of Mercy. It is located in the Midwestern United States with headquarters within Greater St. Louis in the west St. Louis County, Missouri suburb of Chesterfield. Mercy is the seventh largest Catholic health care system in the United States.

Mercy has more than 40 acute care and specialty hospitals. It employs more than 40,000 co-workers and more than 2,400 physicians.

History 
Mercy in the United States traces its roots to 1843, when the first Sisters of Mercy arrived from Ireland. In 1856, the Sisters of Mercy came to St. Louis and founded the Religious Sisters of Mercy of the St. Louis Province. Fifteen years later, in 1871, they opened a 25-bed infirmary for women and children. Over the years, the Sisters of Mercy expanded their health ministry in the Regional Community’s seven-state area: Arkansas, Kansas, Louisiana, Mississippi, Missouri, Oklahoma and Texas.

While the hospitals and other health care facilities sponsored by the Sisters of Mercy were not formally linked, as early as the 1960s they shared management and consulting staff resources. In 1986, to position the individual hospitals for coming changes in health care, the Sisters of Mercy created the Sisters of Mercy Health System. Today, Mercy carries a simplified name and is sponsored by Mercy Health Ministry, which was established by the Catholic Church to oversee the healing ministry and Catholic identity of Mercy.

Locations 

Mercy operates in four states (Missouri, Arkansas, Oklahoma and Kansas) with ministry outreach programs in Texas, Louisiana and Mississippi. Mercy's largest hospital complexes are in Greater St. Louis, Springfield, Missouri, Joplin, Missouri, Northwest Arkansas, Fort Smith, Arkansas and Oklahoma City.

Services 
Mercy provides a full range of medical services from childbirth and pediatric care through adulthood and geriatric care.

Leadership 
Lynn Britton has served as the president and CEO of Mercy since January 2009. Steve Mackin has been named the incoming president and CEO of Mercy effective April 1, 2022.

References

External links 
 Mercy's website

Catholic health care
Hospital networks in the United States
Medical and health organizations based in Missouri
Charities based in Missouri
Catholic charities
Christian charities based in the United States
Catholic hospital networks in the United States